Parched Corn Creek or Parched Corn Hollow is a stream valley in Christian and Greene counties in the Ozarks of southwest Missouri. It is a tributary of Finley Creek.

The source area for the stream is in the southeast corner of Greene County and it flows to the southwest into Christian County and crosses under Missouri Route 125. It continues on southwest to join the Finley about halfway between Linden and Ozark.

According to oral etymology, Parched Corn Creek was so named as it was typically as dry as parched corn.

See also
List of rivers of Missouri

References

Rivers of Christian County, Missouri
Rivers of Greene County, Missouri
Rivers of Missouri